Integrated education in Northern Ireland refers to the bringing together of children, parents and teachers from both Roman Catholic and Protestant traditions in childhood education: the aim being to provide a balanced education, while allowing the opportunity to understand and respect all cultural and religious backgrounds.

History
In 2017 the Northern Ireland government commissioned a report to detail the development of Integrated Education, so as to decide on structures and processes to support the effective planning, growth and development of a more integrated education system, with a framework of viable and sustainable schools. 

Since 1974 the All Children Together (ACT) movement had been lobbying against the segregation in schools in Northern Ireland. The Education (Northern Ireland) Act, 1978 (Dunleath Act) contained a provision that allowed existing schools to transform to integrated status, but none succeeded. Consequently, a group of parents founded Lagan College, a new type of non-sectarian school in September 1981.

By 1987, there were seven newly established integrated schools, and Northern Ireland Council for Integrated Education (NICIE) was formed as a charitable organisation to co-ordinate efforts to develop integrated education, and to support parent groups through the process of opening new schools.

The Education Reform (NI) Order 1989 provided a statutory framework for the development of integrated schools.  Article 64 of the Order defines integrated education as ‘the education together at school of Protestant and Roman Catholic pupils’. It states that it ‘shall be the duty of the Department to encourage and facilitate the development of integrated education’.
Part VI and Schedules 5 and 6 of the Order define the arrangements for the establishment, management and governance of two types of integrated school:  grant maintained integrated schools and controlled integrated schools.

It was at this point that Department of Education began to grant-aid schools with revenue funding.

The Integrated Education Bill 2022 
The Northern Ireland Assembly passed legislation in March 2022 which ensures a duty on the Department of Education to provide further support to the integrated schools sector. The Bill was passed by 49 votes to 38.

Supported Bill: Alliance, Sinn Fein, SDLP

Did not support Bill: DUP, UUP

Northern Ireland Council for Integrated Education
The Northern Ireland Council for Integrated Education (NICIE), a voluntary organisation, promotes, develops and supports integrated education in Northern Ireland.

NICIE’s Statement of Principles go beyond just the education of Protestant and Catholic children in a single building. NICIE aims to create a shared ethos and environment that welcomes and that celebrates all traditions. Schools should have a mixed staff, board of governors and pupils. It celebrates inclusion and fosters creativity in schools. It fosters "an environment where governors, staff, parents – and, in age-appropriate ways, pupils – can engage with social, political and religious debates explicitly and in a sharing and inclusive way."

The four key elements of NICIE’s Statement of Principles are:
 Equality and diversity
 A child-centred education
 A partnership with parents
 A Christian ethos

Educational background
Education in Northern Ireland is highly religiously segregated, with 95% of pupils attending either a maintained (Catholic) school or a controlled school (mostly Protestant, but open to all faiths and none), both funded by the state by varying amounts. In addition there is pressure to open more Irish medium schools. Around 2007 there was surplus of places in existing schools. The churches in Northern Ireland have not been involved in the development of integrated schools. Integrated schools have been established by the voluntary efforts of parents.

Current situation

The first integrated school, Lagan College, was established in Belfast in 1981, in 1985, three more integrated schools opened in Belfast. , there were 65 integrated schools comprising 20 post-primary colleges and 45 primary schools. 27 are Controlled Integrated. Existing controlled schools voted to ‘transform’ and 38 are Grant-Maintained Integrated, new schools, created by the local parents, the last of which, Rowandale Integrated Primary School in Moira, County Down, was established in 2008. In addition, there are 19 integrated nursery schools, most of which are linked to primary schools as at Rowandale.

In March 2022, the Integrated Education Bill was passed.

Criticisms
Integrated schools were sometimes criticised as being "middle-class" or accused of "social engineering". Then Monsignor Denis Faul criticised integrated education, insisting that Catholic parents were required by canon law to send their children to Catholic schools and also claimed the schools were a "dirty political trick" inspired by the British Government. Speaking out against integrated education, the Free Presbyterian Church described it as a "front for ecumenism and the secular lobby".

In July 2021, John O'Dowd said during the second stage debates of the Integrated Education Bill that while integrated schools promote inclusivity "there's only one or very few play Gaelic games. There's none promote the Irish language. I will correct myself: I think that there is one. The identity in it is not neutral - in many of them it is British." He also said "You can pay homage to the Crown but to no-one else". He said that he supported the principle of the bill but urged the integrated sector to "get its head around" how it promotes "all identities". He also said "The reason why we have such a separated education system dating back to the 1920s - and I am no defender of the Catholic hierarchy - is because the Catholic Church took a very strong view of this ... That to keep Irish identity, Irish culture alive in a partitioned state, it would have to have its own education system."

Kellie Armstrong replied that she had never seen that in any integrated school she had visited. She said "In the integrated schools that I go into, I see a culture that is reflective of everyone who attends there and is respectful of all cultures." Regarding promoting the Irish language and Gaelic games she said "I'm somewhat at a loss given the fact that Lagan College and Drumragh Integrated College have both been former winners of the JJ Reilly Cup. Kellie Armstrong says all cultures are respected through integrated education. My own daughter played hurling for her integrated college."
She also said "Irish culture is not eroded, neither is British culture. Integrated education isn't about assimilating young people into one culture - it's about celebrating all cultures."

Shared education initiatives
In 2011, Department of Education launched a new Community Relations, Equality and Diversity in Education policy.

The objectives of the policy are to:
 ensure that learners have an understanding of and respect for the rights, equality and diversity of all without discrimination; 
 educate children and young people to live and participate in the changing world with respect while  taking account of the ongoing intercommunity divisions arising from conflict and increasing diversity within our society;
 equip children and young people with the skills, attitudes and behaviours needed

See also 
 List of integrated schools in Northern Ireland
 Education in Northern Ireland
 Segregation in Northern Ireland
 Educate Together

References

External links 
 Northern Ireland Council for Integrated Education 
 Integrated Education Fund 
 Conflict Archive on the Internet - Education in Northern Ireland

 
Education in Northern Ireland